Carter Curtis Revard (March 25, 1931 – January 3, 2022) was an American poet, scholar, and writer. He was of European American and Osage descent, and grew up on the tribal reservation in Oklahoma. He had his early education in a one-room schoolhouse, before winning a Quiz Bowl scholarship for college, subsequently attending University of Tulsa for his BA.

His Osage name, Nompehwahthe, was given to him in 1952 by Josephine Jump, his Osage grandmother. The same year, he won a Rhodes Scholarship for graduate work at Oxford University. After completing a PhD at Yale University, Revard had most of his academic career at Washington University in St. Louis, where he specialized in medieval British literature and linguistics.

Since 1980, Revard had become notable as a Native American poet and writer, and published several books, as well as numerous articles about the literature. He received numerous awards for this work.

Early life and education 
Revard was born in Pawhuska, Oklahoma, a town within the Osage Indian Reservation on March 25, 1931. He was of European American and Osage descent, and grew up on the tribal reservation in Oklahoma. He grew up in the Buck Creek Valley about 20 miles east, where he and his twin sister were among seven siblings. They were of Osage, Ponca people, French, Irish, and Scotch-Irish heritage. The children were taught up to the eighth grade in a one-room schoolhouse on the Osage reservation. He learned some Osage and Ponca, which are related languages. Revard and his classmates combined schoolwork with farming tasks and odd jobs; Revard also helped train greyhounds for racing. He went to Bartlesville College High; Revard credited his teachers with inspiring his interest in literature and science.

Winning a radio quiz scholarship, Revard attended the University of Tulsa, where he earned a BA. He was mentored by Professor Franklin Eikenberry, who supported him in applying for a Rhodes Scholarship for study at Oxford University, where Revard matriculated at Merton College in 1952, taking a second class English BA degree in 1954. After returning to the United States, he was encouraged by Eikenberry to do further graduate work. Revard earned a PhD in English at Yale University in 1959.

Academic career
Revard first taught at Amherst College. Beginning in 1961, he started teaching at  Washington University in St. Louis, where he had his academic career. The traditional territory of the Osage was in the Missouri region before they were removed to a reservation.

Revard's major scholarly focus throughout his career was on medieval British manuscripts, and their social context. He was a respected voice in this field. He developed classes in language development for study by high school teachers, to engage them in the tremendous work in language that their adolescent students are engaged in. Revard also published scholarly work on linguistics (specifically on the transition between Middle English and later forms of the language).

In 1967, Revard worked on a project in California funded by the military, which related to putting a large dictionary of the English language into computer accessible form, and developing programs to access it; he participated as a "semanticist linguist." It was related to computerizing Webster's Collegiate Dictionary. In August 1968 he gave a paper on this work in Las Vegas, Nevada to the Association for Computational Machinery. He also gave a paper on this work to the New York Academy of Science, which had a "section on lexicography and with the special section on computers", and later published these.

In 1971-1972, Revard went to England on a sabbatical, where he tried to do medieval research at Oxford during a period of student unrest and disruption that damaged important library resources. During this period, he also started writing and sending out poems, which appeared in journals and anthologies, including Voices from the Rainbow: Contemporary Poetry by American Indians released by Viking Press in 1975. His first poetry collection, Ponca War Dancers, was published in 1980 by Point Riders Press out of Norman, Oklahoma. Many of the poems written about his Oxford period would be collected much later in An Eagle Nation (1993), particularly "Homework At Oxford," in which the speaker walks the grounds of the university and has a dream vision of his childhood in north central Oklahoma. Revard has also been a visiting professor at the universities of Tulsa and Oklahoma.

In addition, he published several critical articles about Native American literature, assessing it and placing it in the context of American literatures.

Writing 
Revard's early poems published 1975-1980, culminating in Ponca War Dances, revealed him as a new, strongly political voice among Native American poets. Most of his books interweave poetry, autobiographical essays, and short, sometimes allegorical stories. His poems have also appeared in numerous journals and anthologies, and his work has been translated into French, Spanish, Italian and Hungarian.

An excerpt from "Discovery of the New World":

The creatures that we met this morning
marveled at our green skins
and scarlet eyes.
They lack antennae
and can't be made to grasp
your lawful proclamation that they are
our lawful food and prey and slaves
nor can they seem to learn
their body-space is needed to materialize
our oxygen absorbers —
which they conceive are breathing
and thinking creatures whom they implore
at first as angels or (later) as devils
when they are being snuffed out
by an absorber swelling
into their space. . . .

We need their space and oxygen
which they do not know how to use,
yet they will not give up their gas unforced,
and we feel sure,
whatever our "agreements" made this morning,
we'll have to cook them all:
the more we cook this orbit,
the fewer next time around.

Personal life and death
He was married to Stella, a scholar of Milton. They had four children: Stephen, Geoffrey, Vanessa, and Lawrence. Revard died at his residence in University City on January 3, 2022, at the age of 90.

Awards and professional recognition 
2007 - American Indian Festival of Words Author Award
2005 - Lifetime Achievement Award, Native Writers' Circle of the Americas
2002 - Finalist, Oklahoma Book Award, Nonfiction category, for Winning the Dust Bowl
2000 - Writer of the Year, Wordcraft Circle of Native Writers
1994 - Oklahoma Book Award, Poetry category, for Cowboys and Indians Christmas Shopping
The Spring 2003 issue of the journal, Studies in American Indian Literatures (SAIL) was entirely devoted to discussions of Revard's work; it also included pieces by him.

Carter Revard was a member of the Modern Language Association (MLA), the Association for Studies in American Indian Literature, the River Styx Literary Organization, the Association of American Rhodes Scholars, the University of Tulsa Board of Visitors, the St. Louis Gourd Dancers and Phi Beta Kappa.

He served the American Indian Center of St. Louis as board member, Secretary and President.

Books by Carter Revard 
How the Songs Come Down, Salt Publications (2005), poetry
Winning the Dust Bowl, University of Arizona Press (2001), autobiography 
Family Matters, Tribal Affairs, University of Arizona Press (1999), autobiography
An Eagle Nation, University of Arizona Press (1997) poetry 
Cowboys and Indians Christmas Shopping, Point Riders Press (1992), poetry
Ponca War Dancers, Point Riders Press (1980), poetry

Books about Carter Revard 
The Salt Companion to Carter Revard, Ellen L. Arnold (Ed.)

Further reading
Revard is collected in and/or the subject of essays in the following works: 
Joseph Bruchac III (editor), Nuke Chronicles, New York: Contract II Publications, 1980. 
Joseph Bruchac III (editor), Survival This Way: Interviews With American Indian Poets, (Sun Tracks Books, No 15), University of Arizona Press, 1990 
Janice Gould and Dean Rader (editors), Speak to Me Words: Essays on Contemporary American Indian Poetry,  University of Arizona Press, 2003
John L. Purdy and James Ruppert (editors), Nothing But the Truth: An Anthology of Native American Literature, Upper Saddle River, NJ: Prentice-Hall Publishing, 2001
Brian Swann, Arnold Krupat (editors), I Tell You Now: Autobiographical Essays by Native American Writers, Brompton Books Corporation, 1989 
Norma C. Wilson, The Nature of Native American Poetry, University of New Mexico Press, 2001
Norma C. Wilson, The Spirit of Place in Contemporary American Indian Poetry, University of Oklahoma, 1978

See also 
List of writers from peoples indigenous to the Americas
Native American Studies

Notes

References

External links 
 "Carter Revard", Storytellers: Native American Authors Online, Official website
 SAIL (Studies in American Indian Literature), V. 15, No.1, Spring 2003, contains links to each article online 
Carter Revard, "History, Myth and Identity among Osages and Other Peoples", reprint in Nothing But the Truth: An Anthology of Native American Literature, ed. by John L. Purdy and James Ruppert, Upper Saddle River, NJ: Prentice-Hall Publishing, 2001
 Salt "Carter Revard", Salt Publishing includes video and many audio files
 "American Indian Carter Revard discussed his poems with students in Berlin", US Embassy in Germany, November 10, 2006

1931 births
2022 deaths
People from Pawhuska, Oklahoma
Writers from Oklahoma
Native American writers
Osage Nation
American male poets
American autobiographers
Washington University in St. Louis faculty
American male non-fiction writers
Alumni of Merton College, Oxford
Yale University alumni